Lawrence D. Boston (born May 18, 1956) is an American former professional basketball player.

Born in Cleveland, Ohio, he played college basketball for the Maryland Terrapins.

Boston was selected by the Washington Bullets as the 81st overall pick of the 1978 NBA draft. He played for the Bullets in the National Basketball Association (NBA) for 13 games during the 1979–80 season. He was also under contract with the Cleveland Cavaliers in September 1979, but did not play in the NBA for them.

Boston played professionally in several countries in Europe for over a decade.

References

External links

1956 births
Living people
American expatriate basketball people in Belgium
American expatriate basketball people in France
American expatriate basketball people in Italy
American expatriate basketball people in Switzerland
American men's basketball players
ASVEL Basket players
Basketball players from Cleveland
Lehigh Valley Jets players
Maine Lumberjacks players
Maryland Terrapins men's basketball players
Parade High School All-Americans (boys' basketball)
Power forwards (basketball)
Rochester Zeniths players
Vincennes Trailblazers men's basketball players
Washington Bullets draft picks
Washington Bullets players
American expatriate basketball people in the Philippines
Crispa Redmanizers players
Philippine Basketball Association imports